Namgyal Tsemo Monastery or Namgyal Tsemo Gompa is a Buddhist monastery in Leh district, Ladakh, northern India. Founded by King Tashi Namgyal (1555-1575) of Ladakh, it has a three-story high gold statue of Maitreya Buddha and ancient manuscripts and frescoes. It is situated near the Tsemo Castle.

Footnotes

External links

Buddhist monasteries in Ladakh
Gelug monasteries and temples
1430 establishments in Asia
15th-century establishments in India